Centrosomal protein 104kDa is a protein that in humans is encoded by the CEP104 gene.

Like its Chlamydomonas ortholog, FAP256, it has been shown to localize to the distal ends of both centrioles in the absence of a cilium. During cilium formation, it is found at the tip of the elongating cilium.

References

External links

Further reading 

 
 

Centrosome